Zay Jeffries (April 22, 1888 – May 21, 1965) was an American mining engineer, metallurgist, consulting engineer and recipient of the 1946 John Fritz Medal.

Biography 
Jeffries was born in Willow Lake, South Dakota as one of the nine children of Johnston Jeffries and Florence (Sutton) Jeffries. He obtained his BSc in mining engineering at the South Dakota School of Mines and Technology in 1910. Three years later, he also obtained his MSc in metallurgical engineering from the same school, and in 1918 Harvard University awarded him his Doctor of Science degree. 

After his graduation in 1910 he started as an assayer for the Custer mining company in South Dakota, and later that year he accepted an appointment as an instructor at Case Western Reserve University in Cleveland. In 1916 he was promoted to appointed assistant. 

In 1914 he also started as a consulting engineer in the Cleveland-area. Later he consulted for metallurgy laboratories, and at the University of Chicago; he participated in the Manhattan Project.

Jeffries was elected a member of the National Academy of Sciences in 1939. In 1946 he was awarded the John Fritz Medal. He was elected to the American Philosophical Society in 1948.

In 1950, Jeffries became the Leonard Case Professor on Educational Policy at Case Western.

Jeffries was also a vice president of General Electric: as such, he and other officers were prosecuted in 1948 for violating federal law; that same year, he also received the Medal for Merit. In his later years, Jeffries retired to Pittsfield, Massachusetts, where he died of cancer in May 1965, survived by his wife and daughter.

Pardon

On October 10, 2019, President Donald Trump issued a full pardon to Jeffries for a conviction for engaging in anti-competitive practices in violation of the Sherman Antitrust Act of 1890, for which Jeffries had been convicted in 1948, and assessed a $2,500 fine with no jail time.

Selected publications 
 Jeffries, Zay, and Robert Samuel Archer. The science of metals. McGraw-Hill, 1924.
 Edwards, Junius David, Francis Cowles Frary, and Zay Jeffries. The aluminum industry. Vol. 1. McGraw-Hill book company, inc., 1930.
 Edwards, Junius David, Francis Cowles Frary, and Zay Jeffries. The Aluminum Industry: Aluminum products and their fabrication. Vol. 2. McGraw-Hill book company, Incorporated, 1930.

Articles, a selection
 Jeffries, Zay. "Effect of temperature, deformation, and grain size on the mechanical properties of metals." Trans. AIME 60 (1919): 474–576.
 Jeffries, Zay, and R. S. Archer. "The slip interference theory of the hardening of metals." Chem. and Met. Eng 24.24 (1921): 1057.
 Jeffries, Zay. "The trend in the science of metals."Transactions of the American Institute of Mining and Metallurgical Engineers, 70 (1924): 303–327.

See also

 List of people pardoned or granted clemency by the president of the United States

References

External links 
 Zay Jeffries, General Electric Company. April 22, 1888 - May 21, 1965, National Academy of Sciences

1888 births
1965 deaths
American metallurgists
South Dakota School of Mines and Technology alumni
Harvard University alumni
Case Western Reserve University faculty
People from Clark County, South Dakota
John Fritz Medal recipients
Recipients of American presidential pardons
People who have received posthumous pardons
Fellows of the Minerals, Metals & Materials Society
Members of the American Philosophical Society